Qaleh Vazir (also romanized as Qal’eh Vazīr and Qal‘eh-ye Vazīr; also known as Kalāteh Vazīr and Qal‘eh-ye Bāzār) is a village in Zeberkhan Rural District, Zeberkhan District, Nishapur County, Razavi Khorasan Province, Iran. At the 2006 census, its population was 200, in 60 families.

References 

Populated places in Nishapur County